William David Elliott (June 4, 1934 – September 30, 1983) was an American actor and jazz musician. He had a recurring role in Bridget Loves Bernie as Otis Foster and a recurring role as Officer Gus Grant in Adam-12. He also appeared in Elvis Presley's 1969 film Change of Habit.

Background 
Elliott was born in Baltimore, Maryland. He spent four years in the United States Navy as an electrician. He later worked for US Steel and left the job. He also turned down an opportunity to study at Massachusetts Institute of Technology to be a drummer. He eventually formed his own music group. He married the background vocalist for the group, Dionne Warwick, in 1966. While at the home of Warwick's parents to ask permission to marry Dionne, Elliott was invited by her father to have a talk in the living room. Her father knew of Elliott's reputation as being a ladies man and happened to be cleaning his gun in preparation for a hunting trip. They had two sons together, David and Damon. They divorced in 1967 but soon remarried. They divorced again in 1975.

Television work 
An early appearance on television was in the series Dragnet. The episode Community Relations: DR-10 aired in 1968 and also featured Don Marshall, Rafer Johnson and O. J. Simpson in a minor role. In the early 1970s, Elliott had a recurring role as Otis Foster in the Bernard Slade-created show Bridget Loves Bernie which starred David Birney and Meredith Baxter. He also had a recurring role as Officer Gus Grant on the Adam-12 TV show.

Film work 
He had an early uncredited role as a revolutionary in the Jules Dassin-directed Uptight which was released in 1968. He then played the part of Robbie in the Elvis Presley film Change of Habit which was released in 1969. He subsequently appeared as Leon in The Old Man Who Cried Wolf which starred Edward G. Robinson. The film, released in 1970, also starred Percy Rodrigues and Martin Balsam. It was about an old man who witnessed a murder but nobody believed him. The next film he appeared in was a made-for-television movie, They Call It Murder, which starred Jim Hutton, Robert J. Wilke and Ed Asner. Elliott played the part of Deputy Bob Terry. He played the lead role in the Henry Hathaway film Hangup, released in 1974. In that film he played an honest police officer who comes to grief as he is in love with a drug addict played by Marki Bey. Because Warner Bros. would not distribute the film, Elliott took charge of it and it was eventually distributed by a lesser-known distributor and pushed as a Blaxploitation film. It failed at the box office and attracted a fair amount of criticism.

Music 
Elliott appears on the Together Again! album by Willis Jackson with organist Jack McDuff. His drumming can be heard on four tracks that were recorded in August 1960; three appeared on the "Cookin' Sherry" album in 1961 ("Mellow Blues", "Cookin' Sherry" and "Contrasts"), while the fourth, "Tu'gether", was not released until the "Together Again!" album in 1964. By 1961 he was backing organist DeeDee Ford along with saxophonist / flautist Joe Thomas. By 1962 Rhoda Scott had taken over for DeeDee Ford, and as the Rhoda Scott Trio the group released two albums – "Hey! Hey! Hey! in 1962 and "Live! at the Key Club" in 1963.  In 1964 Elliott and Thomas released their Speak Your Piece album. In 1974, it was announced in the August 3 issue of Billboard that Elliott was opening a studio at the location of the old Brooks Randall Motor Club site at Bronson Avenue and Sunset Boulevard. The studio, which featured recording facilities, a sound stage, rehearsal and dressing rooms, was to cater to the motion picture and recording industry.

Filmography (selected)

References

External links 
 William Elliott at Aveleyman.com
 
 Discogs: Bill Elliott

1934 births
1983 deaths
African-American male actors
American male film actors
Male actors from Baltimore
Military personnel from Baltimore
African-American drummers
American jazz drummers
Jazz musicians from Maryland
Musicians from Baltimore
Prestige Records artists
American electricians
United States Navy sailors
20th-century American drummers
American male drummers
20th-century American male actors
American male jazz musicians
20th-century American male musicians
20th-century African-American musicians
African-American United States Navy personnel